Billy Budd is a short novel by Herman Melville.

Billy Budd can also refer to:

Billy Budd (film), a 1962 film produced, directed, and co-written by Peter Ustinov, based on Melville's novel
Billy Budd (opera), a 1951 opera by Benjamin Britten based on Melville's novel
Billy Budd (play), a 1949 play by Louis O. Coxe and Robert H. Chapman, originally titled Uniform of Flesh
"Billy Budd" (song) a 1994 song from Morrissey's album Vauxhall and I